The following highways are numbered 743:

Canada

United States